Xylocopa latipes, the tropical carpenter bee, is a species of carpenter bee widely dispersed throughout Southeast Asia. As its name suggests, this bee inhabits forests in warm tropical climates and constructs nests by burrowing into wood.  It often makes long deep tunnels in wooden rafters, fallen trees, telephone poles and the like, but is not found in living trees.

It was first scientifically described by the English entomologist, Dru Drury in 1773, and is a member of the group of solitary bees (Family Apidae).

The tropical carpenter bee is a very large, robust, solitary bee.  It is shiny, fully black in colour with fuscous metallic blue-green or purple wings in sunlight.  The tropical carpenter bee is probably the largest Xylocopa known and among the largest bees of the world (though it is not the world's largest, that title belongs to another Southeast Asian bee, the Indonesian Megachile pluto). It has a loud and distinctive, low-pitched buzzing that can be heard as it flies between flowers or perches. In Urban areas, these bees can become attached to certain perches, returning to them day after day, even after several generations.

Mating

Carpenter bees mate on-the-wing.  Males grasp the females in flight and place their front or middle legs, which have fringes of long setae, over the compound eyes of their mate.  It is thought that the dilated front legs of males of some species of carpenter bees collect and trap oils and odours that function during mating.

Xylocopa latipes are considered multivoltine as they can have more than two generations per year but this depends on the availability of floral resources in their habitat.

Nesting

In Malaysia, tropical carpenter bees often choose useful structural woods as nesting sites, as they are able to burrow through it with their powerful mandibles.  Tropical carpenter bees construct multiple galleries (3 - 5) of about 11 cm in length and 2.1 - 2.3 cm in diameter.

Tropical carpenter bees choose dead wood, pithy stems and bamboo culms for nesting.  Preferred wood species for the tropical carpenter bee include, Syzygium cumini, Cassia siamea, Dyera costulata (jelutong), Agathis alba (damar minyak), Alstonia spp. (pulai), and Shorea spp. (light-red meranti).  They tend to avoid nyatoh, kapur, kempas, and mengkulang (local names for native trees of Malaysia).

Role in Pollination

Carpenter bees are used commercially in the Philippines to pollinate passion-fruit flowers.  They naturally perform the same function in Indonesia and Malaysia and the rest of Southeast Asia.  In addition, passion-fruit flowers (Passiflora edulis flavicarpa) have been found to bloom in synchrony with tropical carpenter bee foraging rhythms, indicating an evolving relationship between the two species.

References

latipes
Hymenoptera of Asia
Insects of Indonesia
Insects of Laos
Insects of Malaysia
Insects of Thailand
Insects of Vietnam
Insects of Myanmar
Insects of Cambodia
Insects of Singapore
Fauna of Southeast Asia
Insects described in 1773
Articles containing video clips
Taxa named by Dru Drury